There have been numerous shootings in Colorado, United States.

List
In the age of mass media, three Colorado massacres in the Denver metropolitan area have garnered national attention: the Columbine High School massacre in 1999, which resulted in 15 deaths (including the post-massacre suicides by the two perpetrators); the Aurora shooting in 2012, which resulted in 12 deaths; and the 2021 Boulder shooting, which resulted in 10 deaths.

See also
 List of shootings in California
 List of shootings in Florida
 List of shootings in New York (state)
 List of shootings in Texas

References

shootings in Colorado
History of Colorado
Shootings in Colorado

Murder in Colorado
Colorado
Lists of shootings by location